Hen Island is an island of Bermuda. A human skeleton believed to belong to Thomas Squires, a gunman who died on the island in 1825, was unearthed in 2011.

References

Islands of Bermuda